
Gmina Strzeleczki, German Gemeinde Klein Strehlitz is a rural gmina (administrative district) in Krapkowice County, Opole Voivodeship, in south-western Poland.

Since 2006 the commune, like much of the surrounding area, has been bilingual in German and Polish.

Administrative divisions
The commune contains the villages and settlements of:

Strzeleczki
Buława
Dobra
Dziedzice
Komorniki
Kopalina
Kujawy
Łowkowice
Moszna
Nowy Bud
Nowy Młyn
Pisarzowice
Racławiczki
Ścigów
Serwitut
Smolarnia
Urszulanowice
Wawrzyńcowice
Zbychowice
Zielina

Neighbouring gminas
Gmina Strzeleczki is bordered by the gminas of Biała, Głogówek, Gogolin, Krapkowice and Prószków.

Twin towns – sister cities

Gmina Strzeleczki is twinned with:
 Bitburger Land, Germany
 Dvorce, Czech Republic

References

Strzeleczki
Krapkowice County
Bilingual communes in Poland